This is part of a list of Statutes of New Zealand for the period of the Third Labour Government of New Zealand up to and including part of the first year of the Third National Government of New Zealand.

1973  

 Admiralty Act  Amended: 1975
 Lake Wanaka Preservation Act  Amended: 1988
 New Zealand Day Act 
 Northland Harbour Board Administration Act 
 Overseas Investment Act  Amended: 1977/86/95/98
 Plant Varieties Act  Amended: 1979
 Property Speculation Tax Act  Repealed: 1979
 Rates Rebate Act  Amended: 1974/76/78/79/94/2006
 Recreation and Sport Act  Amended: 1987
 Rent Appeal Act  Amended: 1977
 Services Export Development Grants Act  Amended: 1976
 Shipping Corporation of New Zealand Act 
 Syndicates Act 
 Wellington City Council Empowering Act 
Plus 103 Acts amended and 1 Act repealed.

1974  

 Children and Young Persons Act 1974  Amended: 1977/80/82/83
 Commonwealth Games Symbol Protection Act 
 Cornish Companies Management Act  Amended: 1978/80
 Farm Ownership Savings Act  Amended: 1976/78/80/81/85/87
 Harbour Pilotage Emergency Act 
 Hawke's Bay Harbour Board Act 
 Home Ownership Savings Act  Amended: 1976/81/86/87
 Housing Corporation Act  Amended: 1986/87/89/91/92/2001
 Local Government Act  Amended: 1975/76/77/78/79/80/81/82/83/84/85/86/87/88/89/91/92/93/94/95/96/97/98/99
 Macdonald Adoption Act 
 Marine and Power Engineers' Institute Industrial Disputes Act 
 Marine Pollution Act  Amended: 1974/75/77/80/88/90
 Marlborough Agricultural and Pastoral Association Empowering Act 
 Melanesian Trusts Act 
 New Zealand Export-Import Corporation Act  Amended: 1985/87
 New Zealand Superannuation Act  Amended: 2005
 Niue Constitution Act 
 Palmerston North Showgrounds Act 
 Pork Industry Act 
 Private Investigators and Security Guards Act  Amended: 1978/95/2000/03
 Rural Banking and Finance Corporation Act  Amended: 1976/82/87/88/89
 Time Act  Amended: 1987
 Tobacco Growing Industry Act  Amended: 1951/65/67/76/80/81 Repealed: 1987
 Wanganui Harbour Board Land Development Act 
 Wheat Research Levy Act  Amended: 1981/83
Plus 108 Acts amended

1975  

 Antiquities Act 
 Carterton Borough Council Forestry Empowering Act 
 Christchurch City Forestry Empowering Act 
 Commerce Act  Amended: 1976/79/80/83/85/90/94/96/2001/03/04/05
 Disabled Persons Community Welfare Act  Amended: 1979/80/82/84/88/91/97
 Domestic Actions Act 
 Eastwoodhill Trust Act  Amended: 1994
 Fire Service Act  Amended: 1976/78/79/81/82/83/85/86/87/88/90/92/93/94/95/96/98/2000/02/05
 Misuse of Drugs Act  Amended: 1978/79/80/82/85/86/87/92/95/96/97/98/2000/03/05/06
 Motor Vehicle Dealers Act  Amended: 1976/79/82/85/86/89/94/99
 Mount Maunganui Borough Reclamation and Empowering Act 
 New Zealand Walkways Act  Amended: 1976/77/78/80/82/85/88/94
 Ombudsmen Act  Amended: 1982/88/91/92/93/96/97/99/2003/05
 Private Schools Conditional Integration Act  Amended: 1977/86/91/98
 Treaty of Waitangi Act  Amended: 1977/85/88/93/98/2003/06
 Trustee Companies Management Act  Amended: 1976/78/87
 Unsolicited Goods and Services Act 
 Waitemata City Council Empowering Act 
Plus 114 Acts amended

See also 
The above list may not be current and will contain errors and omissions. For more accurate information try:
 Walter Monro Wilson, The Practical Statutes of New Zealand, Auckland: Wayte and Batger 1867
 The Knowledge Basket: Legislation NZ
 New Zealand Legislation Includes some Imperial and Provincial Acts. Only includes Acts currently in force, and as amended.
 Legislation Direct List of statutes from 2003 to order

Lists of statutes of New Zealand